I Love to Sing the Songs I Sing is the self-produced ninth album by American R&B singer Barry White, released in 1979 on the 20th Century-Fox Records label.

I Love to Sing the Songs I Sing fulfilled White's 20th Century-Fox Records contract. White was increasingly dissatisfied with that label's management when Russ Regan left the label to form Millennium Records and felt that he was being ignored in terms of promotion at the time. He then left the company and signed a custom label contract with CBS Records to release future material under his own Unlimited Gold imprint.  White's first album on his new label, The Message Is Love, was released seven months and six days after I Love to Sing the Songs I Sing.  With attention and interest focused on his well-publicized CBS deal, I Love to Sing the Songs I Sing passed by largely unnoticed.  It was the least successful album of his 20th Century career, only reaching #40 on the R&B chart, which six of his eight previous albums had topped. None of the single releases made any impact either.

Track listing 
 "I Love to Sing the Songs I Sing" (Barry White, Paul Politi, Frank Wilson) - 2:50
 "Girl, What's Your Name" (White, Danny Pearson, Wilson) - 4:08
 "Once Upon a Time (You Were a Friend of Mine)" (Rahn Coleman) - 6:01
 "Oh Me, Oh My (I'm Such a Lucky Guy)" (White, Wilson, Politi, Raymond Cooksey) - 5:04
 "I Can't Leave You Alone" (White, Tony Sepe, Wilson) - 3:25
 "Call Me Baby" (Coleman) - 8:04
 "How Did You Know It Was Me?" (Coleman) - 6:47

Personnel
Barry White - lead vocals, arranger
John Roberts, Ronald Coleman - orchestration 
Technical
Frank Kejmar, Paul Elmore - engineer
Glen Christensen - art direction, design

Singles

References

Barry White albums
1979 albums
20th Century Fox Records albums